BHI may refer to:

 Beverly Hills Internet, former name of GeoCities, a web hosting service
 BHI, station code for Birmingham International railway station, a United Kingdom railway station
 Black Hebrew Israelites, African Americans who believe that they are descendants of the ancient Israelites
 Black Hole Initiative, an interdisciplinary science program at Harvard University
 Bristol Heart Institute, research and medical clinic in Bristol, England
 British Horological Institute, the representative body of the horological industry in the United Kingdom
 Brain heart infusion broth, a growth medium for growing microorganisms
 Bald Head Island, North Carolina, a village located in Brunswick County, North Carolina, United States
 BHI, former stock symbol of Baker Hughes, a General Electric (American) industrial service company
 BHI, inventory number code assigned to all specimen or sample included in the catalogue of the Black Hills Institute of Geological Research (for example, Tyrannosaurus rex specimen nicknamed "Stan" is identified with the inventory number "BHI 3033")